Roberta 'Bobbi' B. Beavers (born May 6, 1942) is an American politician from Maine. Beavers, a Democrat from South Berwick, Maine, served in the Maine House of Representatives from December 2010 until December 2016.

References

1942 births
Living people
People from Shelton, Washington
People from South Berwick, Maine
Rutgers University alumni
Lehigh University alumni
Montclair State University alumni
Democratic Party members of the Maine House of Representatives
Women state legislators in Maine
21st-century American politicians
21st-century American women politicians